Polintons (also called Mavericks) are large DNA transposons which contain genes with homology to viral proteins and which are often found in eukaryotic genomes. They were first discovered in the mid-2000s and are the largest and most complex known DNA transposons. Polintons encode up to 10 individual proteins and derive their name from two key proteins, a DNA polymerase and a retroviral-like integrase.

Properties
A typical polinton is around 15–20 kilobase pairs in size, though examples have been described up to 40kb. Polintons encode up to 10 proteins, the key elements being the protein-primed type B DNA polymerase and the retroviral-like integrase from which they derive their name. Polintons are sometimes referred to as "self-synthesizing" transposons, because they encode the proteins necessary to replicate themselves. Most polintons also encode an adenoviral-like cysteine protease, an FtsK-like ATPase, and proteins with homology to the jelly-roll fold structure of viral capsid proteins. The presence of putative capsid proteins has prompted suggestions that polintons may be able to form virions under some conditions; however, this has not been demonstrated experimentally.

Polinton sequences contain terminal inverted repeats characteristic of transposable elements, usually on the order of 100–1000 base pairs. They also possess a 6bp target site duplication sequence at the insertion site.

Distribution
Polintons have been detected in all groups of eukaryotes other than the Archaeplastida (containing red algae, green algae, glaucophytes, and land plants). They are particularly common in unikonts, a group that includes animals. The pathogenic parasite Trichomonas vaginalis, which causes trichomoniasis, has a unique genome composed of up to 30% polintons.

Evolution

Early descriptions of polintons identified them as likely to be ancient, at least one billion years old and possibly associated with an early ancestor of modern eukaryotes. Phylogenetic analyses of known polinton sequences support this ancestry model and suggest that transmission of polintons is mainly vertical (though horizontal gene transfer of a polinton has been reported).

The evolutionary relationships between polintons, double-stranded DNA viruses, and selfish genetic elements are complex. The first descriptions of polintons linked them by sequence relationship to linear plasmids, bacteriophages, and adenoviruses. More recently, relationships have been identified between polintons, virophages, and giant viruses. Polintons are increasingly thought to form one component of a complex genetic network linking selfish genetic elements in eukaryotic genomes with double-stranded DNA viruses. Through homology in at least one and usually several genes, polintons are evolutionarily linked to linear plasmids, virophages (especially Mavirus virophage, family Lavidaviridae), giant viruses (Megavirales), Ginger 1 transposons, Tlr1 transposons, transpovirons, eukaryotic viruses of the Adenoviridae family, and bacteriophages of the Tectiviridae family.

The Maveriviricetes class of viruses is named after their resemblance to Maverick/Polinton transposons. All the viruses mentioned are united under Bamfordvirae for their double jelly-roll capsid. Some polinton-like viruses (PLVs) other than Tlr1 have also been identified, and are yet to be put into a taxon (presumably under Maveriviricetes).

Discovery and nomenclature
Giant transposable elements were originally discovered in the mid-2000s, beginning with the description of a novel family of retroviral-like integrase proteins which were then associated with transposable elements given the name Mavericks. Meanwhile, an overlapping class of transposable element was described under the name polintons, derived from the key proteins polymerase and integrase, by Vladimir Kapitonov and Jerzy Jurka. Both terms continue in common use.

Because of their viral capsid-like proteins and self-replication abilities, it has been suggested that polintons are capable of forming virions and would properly be termed polintoviruses. However, this terminology is not yet accepted and awaits experimental validation of the virion hypothesis.

References

DNA mobile genetic elements